The Charmer is the second studio album by American jam band Family Groove Company released on April 25, 2006.  It was recorded at Studio Chicago in Chicago, Illinois in December 2005.  Additional recording was done at Studio 710 in Chicago and Vine Sounds in Highland Park, Illinois.

Personnel
Janis Wallin - Bass and Vocals
Jordan Wilkow - Hammond B-3, Rhodes, Piano, and Vocals
Adam Lewis - Guitar
Mattias Blanck - Drums, Percussion, and Vocals

Track listing
"The Charmer" – 5:06
"Remember Sue" – 3:55
"The Money Shuffle" – 5:30
"One Eye Dreaming" – 5:56
"The Well Wisher" – 3:14
"Virginia Hill" – 6:00
"I Can't Tell You" – 5:41
"Byron's Got the Time" – 5:49
"Bird 'n' Diz" – 5:27
"Sabrina Waits" – 5:36
"The Bends" – 4:01
"Like I Said" – 5:56
"Ready Fire Aim" – 5:17
"Post Sco Ergo Propter Sco" – 1:45

Additional notes
Music and lyrics by Jordan Wilkow except tracks 5 and 11, by Family Groove Company
Art design and layout by Adam Lewis
Produced by Family Groove Company

Family Groove Company albums
2006 albums